"Rivers of Babylon" is a song by The Melodians, notably covered by Boney M.

Rivers of Babylon or Waters of Babylon may also refer to:

 "By the rivers of Babylon" or "By the waters of Babylon", the first phrase from Psalm 137 in Jewish liturgy and the Hebrew Bible
 A 4-part round By the Waters of Babylon by Philip Hayes, closely paraphrasing the beginning of the above Psalm
 A 3-part round Babylon, based on Hayes' composition, included in American Pie (Don McLean album) 
 Rivers of Babylon (novel), a novel by Peter Pišťanek
 Rivers of Babylon (film), a 1998 Slovak film
 By the Rivers of Babylon, a novel by Nelson DeMille
 "By the Waters of Babylon", a short story by Stephen Vincent Benét
 "By the Waters of Babylon: Little Poems in Prose" a poem by Emma Lazarus

Hebrew Bible words and phrases